The 2022 United States House of Representatives election in Wyoming was held on November 8, 2022, to elect the U.S. representative for . The election coincided with other elections to the House of Representatives, elections to the United States Senate, and various state and local elections.

Incumbent Republican Liz Cheney was reelected with 68.6% of the vote in 2020, but she faced backlash from her party for her opposition to Donald Trump, vocal support of Trump's second impeachment, and vote in favor and service on the January 6th Committee. She was defeated by pro-Trump candidate Harriet Hageman in the Republican primary on August 16, 2022, with a landslide 66.3% of the vote going to Hageman. Cheney's margin of defeat marked the second-worst for a House incumbent in the last 60 years, behind that of South Carolina Republican Bob Inglis in a 2010 primary runoff.

Democrats nominated nonprofit founder Lynette Grey Bull. As expected in this solidly Republican state, Hageman won in a landslide. However, Grey Bull did manage to flip Albany County, which Cheney had won in 2020.

Republican primary

Background
Incumbent Liz Cheney was criticized by supporters of former president Donald Trump for her vote to impeach him, as well as refusing to object to the certification of the Electoral College results in the 2020 presidential election. Following her impeachment vote, Florida Congressman Matt Gaetz appeared at a rally at the Wyoming State Capitol in support of ousting Cheney, with Donald Trump Jr. also supporting it by phone in January 2021. For the same reason, the Wyoming Republican Party later voted to censure her and requested that she resign or be primaried in the next election. Later that year, it also voted 31-29 to no longer recognize Cheney as a member due to her actions to participate in the January 6 Select Committee shortly after being removed as Conference Chair.

In February 2021, members of the Freedom Caucus attempted to have Cheney removed from her position as Chair of the House Republican Conference in response to her impeachment vote. In a secret ballot, 61 members of the conference voted to remove, while 145 voted not to remove. Cheney retained her position in large part because of the support by these Republicans, including House Minority Leader Kevin McCarthy and House Minority Whip Steve Scalise. Eventually, however, Cheney's continued criticism of Trump lost her support by more Republicans, including McCarthy and Scalise, and McCarthy was caught on a hot mic saying "I've had it with her" in reference to Cheney. On May 12, 2021, Cheney was removed from her position as conference chair by a voice vote and replaced with Elise Stefanik.

On May 21, 2021, challenger Anthony Bouchard admitted that as a teenager he fell in love with and started dating a 14-year-old girl who he subsequently impregnated then married, Bouchard was 18 at the time. Bouchard claimed he went public with the story because he had learned that the story was being investigated by others, though the Cheney campaign denied investigating it. He compared his relationship with the unnamed girl to "the Romeo and Juliet story." The two were married but divorced three years later, and she committed suicide at age 20. Bouchard continued to raise their son after her death, though he says the two are now estranged.

Cheney and Adam Kinzinger were censured by the Republican National Committee at its meeting in Salt Lake City on February 4, 2022, due to "actions in their positions as members of the January 6th Select Committee not befitting Republican members of Congress". The Wyoming delegation to the committee also submitted a "Rule 11" letter formalizing support for challenger Harriet Hageman and allowing the RNC to spend money allocated for Wyoming's party branch on her behalf. At the same time, support of Hageman surged following the censure of Cheney. Hageman has referred to Donald Trump as "racist and xenophobic" and also as "the weakest candidate" during the 2016 presidential election; at the same time Hageman endorsed Cheney and called her a "proven, courageous, constitutional conservative."

Following Cheney's defeat, she called Hageman to concede the race. However, Hageman alleged that Cheney only left 2 words: "Hi Harriet". This prompted Cheney to release the full audio recording of the call which showed that she did, in fact, concede the race. The Hageman camp asserted that a technical glitch was at fault.

Candidates

Nominee
 Harriet Hageman, lawyer, former member of the Republican National Committee and candidate for Governor of Wyoming in 2018

Eliminated in primary

 Robyn Belinskey, businesswoman
 Anthony Bouchard, state senator from the 6th district
 Liz Cheney, incumbent U.S. Representative, vice chair of the House January 6 Committee and former chair of the House Republican Conference
 Denton Knapp, retired U.S. Army colonel

Withdrawn
 Chuck Gray, state representative for the 57th district (running for Secretary of State)
 Bryan Miller, chair of the Sheridan County Republican Party and candidate for the U.S. Senate in 2014 and 2020 (endorsed Hageman)
 Darin Smith, attorney, Christian Broadcasting Network executive and candidate for this seat in 2016 (endorsed Hageman)

Declined
 Bo Biteman, state senator from the 21st district (endorsed Hageman)
 Edward Buchanan, Secretary of State of Wyoming
 William Perry Pendley, former Acting Director of the Bureau of Land Management

Endorsements

Debates and forums

Wyoming PBS has had a tradition of hosting one debate for each for the Democratic and Republican primaries for all candidates on the ballot in their respective primaries as well as one general election debate for all candidates on the ballot. All Republican candidates on the ballot that didn't withdraw were included in the sole debate. This debate was not open to the public, but was open to media outlets. Due to Liz Cheney's role as Vice Chair in the hearings for the United States House Select Committee on the January 6 Attack which were broadcast, different MSNBC hosts would later show debate clips of her defending her work in the committee.

Polling
Aggregate polls

Graphical summary

Results

Democratic primary

Candidates

Nominee
 Lynnette Grey Bull, nonprofit founder, member of the Northern Arapaho tribe, and nominee in 2020

Eliminated in primary
 Steve Helling, attorney and pro-Trump activist
 Meghan Jensen, chair of the Sweetwater County Democratic Party

Debates and forums

Results

Independent and third-party candidates

Constitution Party

Nominee
 Marissa Selvig, former Mayor of Pavillion

Eliminated at convention
 Joe Shogrin, Laramie County contact for the Wyoming Constitution Party

Libertarian Party

Nominee
Richard Brubaker, nominee for this seat in 2012, 2014, 2018, and 2020

Independents

Failed to qualify for ballot
 Casey William Hardison, chemist

General election 
In the general election, Hageman faced Democratic nominee and Native American activist Lynnette Grey Bull, who was Cheney's opponent in 2020. However, Hageman was overwhelmingly favored in November. Republicans had a nearly 7-to-1 advantage in registration over Democrats, and Trump carried the state in 2020 with 70 percent of the vote, his strongest state-level performance in the nation.

Hageman won the 2022 election. She is the fourth consecutive Republican woman to represent Wyoming in the House. Barbara Cubin won the seat in 1994, followed by Cynthia Lummis in 2008, followed by Cheney in 2016, and followed by Hageman.

Predictions

Debates 
Lynette Grey Bull (D), Richard Brubaker (L) and Marissa Selvig (C) attended a debate hosted by Wyoming PBS on 14 October. Hageman declined to attend the debate.

Polling

Results

Notes

Partisan clients

References

External links
 
 
  (State affiliate of the U.S. League of Women Voters)
 

Official campaign websites for candidates
 Richard Brubaker (L) for Congress
 Lynnette Grey Bull (D) for Congress 
 Harriet Hageman (R) for Congress
 Marissa Selvig (C) for Congress

Wyoming
2022
House